The 1921 Montana football team represented the University of Montana in the 1921 college football season. They were led by third-year head coach Bernie Bierman, played their home games at Dornblaser Field and finished the season with a record of three wins, three losses and one tie (3–3–1).

Schedule

References

Montana
Montana Grizzlies football seasons
Montana football